Olearia ballii, commonly known as mountain daisy, is a species of flowering plant in the family Asteraceae and is endemic to Lord Howe Island. It is a dense shrub with crowded linear leaves and small, purplish and white, daisy-like inflorescences.

Description

Taxonomy
Mountain daisy was first formally described in 1874 by Ferdinand von Mueller who gave it the name Aster ballii in Fragmenta Phytographiae Australiae. In 1896, William Hemsley changed the name to Olearia ballii in the Annals of Botany. The specific epithet (ballii) honours Lieutenant Henry Lidgbird Ball who, while commanding HMS Supply in 1788, discovered and named Lord Howe Island, where the plant was subsequently collected.

Distribution and habitat
Olearia ballii is endemic to Australia’s Lord Howe Island where it grows on the southern mountains and is common at altitudes above .

References

Asterales of Australia
ballii
Endemic flora of Lord Howe Island
Plants described in 1896
Taxa named by Ferdinand von Mueller